Anne of Windy Poplars—published as Anne of Windy Willows in the UK, Australia, and Japan—is an epistolary novel by Canadian author L. M. Montgomery. First published in 1936 by McClelland and Stewart, it details Anne Shirley's experiences while serving as principal of a high school in Summerside, Prince Edward Island over three years. A large portion of the novel is presented through letters Anne writes to her fiancé, Gilbert Blythe.  Chronologically, the book is fourth in the series, but it was the seventh book written.

The book's United States copyright was renewed in 1963.

Plot
The novel takes place over the three years between Anne's graduation from Redmond College and her marriage to Gilbert Blythe. While Gilbert is in medical school, Anne takes a job as the principal of Summerside High School, where she also teaches. She lives in a beautiful house called Windy Poplars with two elderly widows, Aunt Kate and Aunt Chatty, their housekeeper, Rebecca Dew, and their cat, Dusty Miller.

During this time, Anne must win over the clannish and resentful Pringle family, as well as her icy colleague, Katherine Brooke. Along the way, she meets many of Summerside's more eccentric residents and becomes involved in helping many romances, which do not always turn out as planned. She also befriends the lonely Elizabeth Grayson, a motherless member of the Pringle family who lives next door to Windy Poplars. She frequently visits Marilla at Green Gables.

At the end of the novel, Anne departs Summerside to return to Avonlea for her wedding to Gilbert. Many of the town's residents express their appreciation for how she has helped them over the years, including Katherine Brooke and Elizabeth Grayson.

Characters
Anne Shirley - Moving from Green Gables in Avonlea to Windy Poplars in Summerside, Anne takes a job as principal of Summerside High School while her fiancé Gilbert finishes medical school. Over three years, she must win over the snobbish Pringles who rule the town, befriend the resentful vice-principal, and help the lonely girl who lives next door.
Aunt Kate MacComber - The owner of Windy Poplars who was previously married to a splendid sea captain.
Aunt Charlotte "Chatty" MacLean - A sweet, sensitive old widow who lives at Windy Poplars. A frivolous woman, she likes to buttermilk her face, read novels, and play cards.
Rebecca Dew - The housekeeper at Windy Poplars. Summerside believes that she rules the "widows" with her outspoken ways and demands, but her employers have learned to manage her through reverse psychology.
Elizabeth Grayson - A lonely and unhappy 8-year-old girl who lives next door to Windy Poplars. Her mother died when she was born and her father works abroad. Little Elizabeth dreams about "Tomorrow" and changes her name based on her mood.
Mrs. Campbell - Little Elizabeth's cold and unloving great-grandmother.
Martha Monkman - Mrs. Campbell's elderly housekeeper who helps her look after Little Elizabeth. Better known as "the Woman", she is just as strict and cruel as her employer, telling Elizabeth that "Tomorrow" will never come.
Katherine Brooke - The sarcastic and bitter vice-principal of Summerside High School. She wanted the principal job and resents Anne for getting it.
Jen Pringle - A student at Summerside High School who is highly intelligent but dislikes Anne and causes trouble in class.
Sophy Sinclair - A non-Pringle student in Anne's class. She is a plain and quiet girl who longs to play Mary, Queen of Scots in the school play.
Lewis Allen - An orphaned pupil who does housework to pay for his board.
Ellen Pringle - An elderly woman who lives with her sister Sarah in a mansion called Maplehurst. Elegant and sweet-looking, she does what her sister tells her and is known for her pound cake recipe, which Aunt Chatty desperately wishes to have.  
Sarah Pringle - Ellen's sister who lives with her at Maplehurst and who bosses the entire Pringle clan. When an old diary with information about her family is uncovered, Miss Sarah leaves her home for the first time in a decade to save the Pringles' reputation.
Pierce Grayson - Little Elizabeth's distant father who moved to Paris after his wife died.
Valentine Courtaloe - The local dressmaker who knows everything about everyone in Summerside, living and dead.
Trix Taylor - A jolly twenty-year-old who pours out her woes to Anne. She seeks Anne's help when her father's attitude threatens her sister's engagement.
Esme Taylor - Trix's sweet, timid sister who is madly in love with a college professor and fears he will not propose because of her family.
Cyrus Taylor- The father of Trix and Esme who is prone to sulky fits.
Dr. Lennox Carter - A modern languages professor at Redmond College and the object of Esme's affection.
Mrs. Gibson - An old acquaintance of Marilla's from White Sands. A demanding eighty-year-old, she uses a wheelchair and is waited on hand and foot by her timid, middle-aged daughter Pauline.
Pauline Gibson - Mrs. Gibson's daughter who takes care of her and dares not do anything without asking her mother. Anne helps Pauline convince the crotchety Mrs. Gibson to let her attend a cousin's silver wedding anniversary for one day.
Nora Nelson - The last of six sisters to be single who fought with one of her former sweethearts and fears she may never marry.
Jim Wilcox - Nora's suitor whom she has dated on and off for four years. Anne brings them back together by putting a light in Nora's attic, a signal the two lovers previously used.
Hazel Marr - A newcomer in Summerside who has a notorious "crush" on Anne. She reveals to Anne that she does not love her wealthy beau enough to marry him.
Terry Garland - Hazel's beau whom Anne believes would fall in love with any pretty girl. He considers their engagement to be nothing more than childish nonsense.
Mrs. Raymond - The mother of Gerald and Geraldine, eight-year-old twins whom Anne looks after while Mrs. Raymond attends a funeral.
Geraldine Raymond - The daughter of Mrs. Raymond and Gerald's twin sister.
Gerald Raymond - The son of Mrs. Raymond and Geraldine's twin brother.
Ivy Trent - A girl whom the Raymond twins dislike. Geraldine is jealous of her because she has better clothes. She asks Gerald to be her beau.
Sibyl "Dovie" Westcott - A pretty, likeable girl of nineteen and a distant relative of Aunt Kate. She has been engaged for over a year until Anne convinces her to elope against her father's wishes.
Jarvis Morrow - A successful young lawyer and Dovie's fiancé who cannot win her father's approval.
Franklin Westcott - Dovie's somber, widowed father who has never allowed his daughter to have any suitors.
Minerva Tomgallon- The last remaining member of her family who lives alone and rarely goes out except to church. She invites Anne over for dinner and tells her the tragic lives of her relatives.

Series
Montgomery continued the story of Anne Shirley in a series of sequels. They are listed in the order of Anne's age in each novel.

Windy Poplars vs Windy Willows

Montgomery's original title for the book was Anne of Windy Willows, but her US publisher requested that she change the title because of the title's similarities to The Wind in the Willows. Additionally, her publisher requested some cuts to the book, mainly for perceived gory or terrifying content. Montgomery complied, and the edited novel was published in the United States and Canada as Anne of Windy Poplars. Her UK publisher, however, did not see the need for the edits and published the unabridged version under the original title, Anne of Windy Willows.

Adaptations

A film version of the novel and sequel to the 1934 film Anne of Green Gables was released in 1940, featuring the return of Anne Shirley (formerly billed as Dawn O'Day). The film recorded a loss of $176,000.

The novel also serves as the primary source for the television mini-series Anne of Green Gables: The Sequel (1987).

References

External links
 
 Anne of Windy Poplars full text along with free PDF and ebook download.
 Official page on the Sullivan Anne trilogy On the world-famous Canadian miniseries, based in part on Anne of Windy Poplars, with a message board for fans
The Anne Shirley Homepage - A great resource for all Anne fans with galleries, fan art, time lines, recipes and calendars.
 An L.M. Montgomery Resource Page Resource on L.M. Montgomery and Anne's Legacy
 L.M. Montgomery Online Formerly the L.M. Montgomery Research Group, this site includes a blog, extensive lists of primary and secondary materials, detailed information about Montgomery's publishing history, and a filmography of screen adaptations of Montgomery texts. See, in particular, the page about Anne of Windy Poplars.
 The L.M. Montgomery Literary Society This site includes information about Montgomery's works and life and research from the newsletter, The Shining Scroll.

Anne of Green Gables books
Canadian young adult novels
1936 Canadian novels
Epistolary novels
Canadian novels adapted into films
Novels by Lucy Maud Montgomery
Novels set in Prince Edward Island
McClelland & Stewart books
Novels set in high schools and secondary schools
1936 children's books
Canadian children's books
Canadian children's novels